To shut down or power off a computer is to remove power from a computer's main components in a controlled way. After a computer is shut down, main components such as CPUs, RAM modules and hard disk drives are powered down, although some internal components, such as an internal clock, may retain power.

Implementations
The shutdown feature and command is available in Microsoft Windows, ReactOS, HP MPE/iX, and in a number of Unix and Unix-like operating systems such as Apple macOS.

Microsoft Windows and ReactOS

In Microsoft Windows and ReactOS, a PC or server is shut down by selecting the  item from the Start menu on the desktop. Options include shutting down the system and powering off, automatically restarting the system after shutting down, or putting the system into stand-by mode.

Just like other operating systems, Windows has the option to prohibit selected users from shutting down a computer. On a home PC, every user may have the shutdown option, but in computers on large networks (such as Active Directory), an administrator can revoke the access rights of selected users to shut down a Windows computer. Nowadays there are many software utilities which can automate the task of shutting down a Windows computer, enabling automatic computer control. The Windows Shutdown website lists various software utilities to automate the task of shutting down.

In Windows, a program can shut down the system by calling the ExitWindowsEx or NtShutdownSystem function.

Command-line interface

There is also a shutdown command that can be executed within a command shell window. shutdown.exe is the command-line shutdown application (located in %windir%\System32\shutdown.exe) that can shut down the user's computer or another computer on the user's network. Different parameters allow different functions. More than one parameter can be used at a time for this command.

Apple macOS

In Apple macOS the computer can be shut down by choosing "Shut Down…" from the Apple Menu, by pressing  key/button (or  key), or by pressing the power key to bring up the power management dialog box and selecting button "Shut down". An administrator may also use the Unix shutdown command as well. It can also be shut down by pressing  key/button (or  key) or clicking Shut Down on the Apple Menu while holding the  key, but this will not prompt the user anything at all. On newer and some older Apple computers, starting with Mac OS 9, the user is given a time limit in which the computer will automatically shut down if the user does not click the "Shut Down" button.

Unix and Linux

In Unix and Linux, the shutdown command can be used to turn off or reboot a computer. Only the superuser can shut the system down.

One commonly issued form of this command is shutdown -h now, which will shut down a system immediately. Another one is shutdown -r now to reboot. Another form allows the user to specify an exact time or a delay before shutdown: shutdown -h 20:00 will turn the computer off at 8:00 PM, and shutdown -r +1 will automatically reboot the machine in one minute of issuing the command.

See also
 Booting
 Hibernation
 Sleep mode
 Ctrl+Alt+Del

References

Further reading

External links

shutdown | Microsoft Docs
shutdown.cc – an article about various ways of automated and manual shutting down of Microsoft Windows

Operating system technology
Windows commands
Windows administration
MacOS
Unix process- and task-management-related software